During World War II some 70,000 Finnish children (the 'war children' ) were evacuated from Finland, chiefly to Sweden, but also to Norway and Denmark. Most were evacuated during the Continuation War (1941–1944) to ease the situation for their parents who set out to rebuild their homes in the re-conquered Karelia returning from the 1940 evacuation of Finnish Karelia. The first surge of evacuees arrived, however, during the Winter War when the Finns had reasons to fear a humanitarian catastrophe following the expected Soviet occupation.

Effects 
In retrospect, the evacuation has been considered psychologically flawed, as the separations turned out to inflict a far greater damage on the evacuees than the damage suffered by those children who had remained with their parents in Finland. In comparison to Finland's approximately 23,000 military deaths in the Winter War, the 66,000 in the Continuation War, and the total of 2,000 civilian deaths – and the roughly equally many seriously wounded – the war children were, of course, not physically injured, let alone killed. However, their number is of about the same size as that of the war invalids, and many of them feel their sufferings to be ignored.

Fate 
After the war, Finland experienced times of economic hardship, and also substantial insecurity with regard to the Soviet Union's plans for Finland, which resulted in the delay of the return of the children for several years. Ultimately, about 20% of the war children stayed with their foster families after the war, who often adopted them. Many more returned to Sweden as adults, when the prolonged post-war hardship in Finland pushed large contingents of unemployed Finns to Sweden's booming economy in the 1950s–60s.

2005 film – Mother of Mine 
Mother of Mine (Finnish: Äideistä parhain, Swedish: Den bästa av mödrar) is a 2005 Finnish-Swedish film directed by Klaus Härö about a Finnish war child who is sent by his mother to live in Sweden during World War II. The film is based on a novel by Heikki Hietamies. It received good reviews from the Finnish press, and was selected as Finland's submission for Best Foreign Language Film at the 78th Academy Awards.

Notable people 
Notable people who, as a child, were evacuated from Finland to Sweden during World War II:
 Jean Cronstedt (born 1932), Swedish gymnast
 Toini Gustafsson (born 1938), Swedish cross-country skier
 Pentti Kaskipuro (1930–2010), Finnish artist
 Laila Kinnunen (1939–2000), Finnish singer
 Frej Lindqvist (born 1937), Swedish actor
 Carita Nyström (1940–2019), Finnish writer, poet, journalist and feminist
 Pentti Saarikoski (1937–1983), Finnish poet

See also
Evacuation of children in the Spanish Civil War – from the north of the Second Spanish Republic to various European countries.

Notes and references

External links

Child refugees
Winter War
Continuation War
1940s in Sweden
Immigration to Sweden
Finland–Sweden relations
Finnish refugees
Refugees in Sweden
Refugees by war
War children

no:Krigsbarn#Finske krigsbarn i Sverige